Amandus or Æneus Salvius Amandus Augustus was a rebel in Gaul in the time of Diocletian and leader of the Bagaudae.

Biography 
Amandus instigated a revolt in Gaul in 285. After the death of the emperor Carinus, he took charge of a group of peasants ruined by taxes, fugitive slaves, and thieves with the assistance of Aelianus.

The two crowned themselves emperor, burnt several villages, and ransomed several cities. In response, the emperor Diocletian sent Maximian Herculeus. Maximiam weakened their forces in several battles, before forcing them to retreat to a citadel near Paris now known as Saint-Maur-des-Fossés. Maximiam successfully destroyed the citadel and killed everyone inside, including Amandus.

References 

285